The North Australian Workers' Union (NAWU) was a trade union in the Northern Territory between 1927 and 1972. It was a publisher of a newsletter in Darwin, the Northern Standard.

The union was involved in Aboriginal Australians' working conditions on cattle stations in the 1960s. In 1965 the Union applied to the Commonwealth Conciliation and Arbitration Commission to amend the Northern Territory’s pastoral award to remove sections discriminating against Aboriginal workers. The pastoralists resisted strongly; the Commission eventually agreed, but in consideration of the pastoralists' concerns of what it would cost them, delayed implementation by three years. This delay helped lead towards the Gurindji strike (Wave Hill walk-off).

The union was deregistered in 1972.

References

Further reading

Resources on Trove

Defunct trade unions of Australia
1927 establishments in Australia
1972 disestablishments in Australia
Trade unions established in 1927